Admiral Rabinder "Robin" Kumar Dhowan PVSM, AVSM, YSM, ADC was the 22nd  Chief of Naval Staff of the Indian Navy. He assumed office on 17 April 2014, succeeding Admiral D.K. Joshi.

Military career
Dhowan graduated from the National Defence Academy (45th Course, Charlie squadron) on 1 January 1975. He was honoured with a "telescope" for being the "Best Cadet", and was later awarded the 'Sword of Honour' on completion of his midshipman training. He has commissioned an acting sub-lieutenant on 3 May 1975.

From 2002 to 2005, he was the Naval Adviser at the Indian High Commission at London.

Flag rank
After his elevation to flag rank, he served in various staff and instructional assignments. He was the Assistant Chief of Naval Staff (Policy and Plans) in the Integrated Headquarters (Navy) and then commanded the Eastern Fleet.

He also served as the Chief of Staff at Headquarters, Eastern Naval Command in Visakhapatnam and the Chief Staff Officer (Operations) at the Western Naval Command. He then took charge as the Commandant of the National Defence Academy, Khadakvasla, and later served as a Deputy Chief of Naval Staff.

He was appointed as the Vice Chief of Naval Staff in August 2011.

He is an alumnus of National Defence Academy, Defence Services Staff College, and Naval War College, Rhode Island, USA, and has completed the Sea Harrier Direction course in the U.K.

Personal life

Admiral Dhowan is married to Minu Dhowan, and the couple have a daughter and two sons.

He plays golf and does yachting.

Advisor 
Currently, he is a member of the Board of Advisors of India's International Movement to Unite Nations (I.I.M.U.N.).

Awards

References

|-

|-

|-

|-

|-

Chiefs of the Naval Staff (India)
Vice Chiefs of Naval Staff (India)
Deputy Chiefs of Naval Staff (India)
Commandants of the National Defence Academy
Living people
Indian Navy admirals
Flag Officers Commanding Eastern Fleet
Recipients of the Param Vishisht Seva Medal
Recipients of the Ati Vishisht Seva Medal
Year of birth missing (living people)
Naval War College alumni
Recipients of the Yudh Seva Medal
Indian naval attachés
Defence Services Staff College alumni
National Defence Academy (India) alumni